The Women's road time trial C5 road cycling event at the 2016 Summer Paralympics took place on the afternoon of 14 September at Flamengo Park, Pontal. 9 riders competed over two laps of a fifteen kilometre course.

The C5 category is for cyclists with mild upper limb impairment.

Results
Women's road time trial C5. 14 September 2016, Rio.

References

Women's road time trial C5